Xavier Daufresne (born 24 December 1968) is a former tennis player from Belgium.

Daufresne turned professional in 1988.  He did not win any Grand Prix tennis or ATP Tour titles (in either singles or doubles) during his career. The right-hander reached his highest individual ranking on the ATP Tour on 21 March 1994, when he was ranked World No. 109.

At the 1994 Australian Open Daufresne defeated three future grand slam finalists; Thomas Johansson, Thomas Enquist & Patrick Rafter enroute to the final 16.

External links
 
 

1968 births
Living people
Belgian male tennis players
People from Lasne
Sportspeople from Walloon Brabant
20th-century Belgian people